Conotalopia musiva is a species of sea snail, a marine gastropod mollusk in the family Trochidae, the top snails.

Description
The size of the conical shell attains 10 mm. The six whorls are  covered with brown checkered spirals. The whorls are bicarinate but the body whorl is tricarinate. The base of the shell is polished and slightly convex. The large umbilicus is conical. The aperture is circular. The columella is barely reflected and ends at the keel of the umbilicus. The horny operculum shows granulate lines of growth.

Distribution
This marine species occurs in the Red Sea and off the Philippines and off Hong Kong.

References

 Higo, S., Callomon, P. & Goto, Y. (1999). Catalogue and bibliography of the marine shell-bearing Mollusca of Japan. Osaka. : Elle Scientific Publications. 749 pp.

External links
 World Register of Marine Species

musiva
Gastropods described in 1861